Netball Central may refer to:

 Netball Central, Sydney, Australia
 Netball Central, governing body affiliated to Central Pulse and Netball New Zealand
 Netball Central, netball news website